Theater of War is the second album by the Ohio based Christian power metal band Jacobs Dream. It was released in 2001 on Metal Blade Records.

Track listing
 "Sanctuary" - 4:45
 "Theater of War" - 4:47
 "Traces of Grace" - 5:25
 "Wisdom" - 5:34
 "The Warning" - 4:22
 "Sarah Williams" - 7:08
 "De Machina Est Deo" - 3:42
 "Black Souls" - 3:50
 "Critical Mass" - 5:26

Credits
James Evans - Bass
John Berry - Guitar, Synth
Derek Eddleblute - Guitar
David Taylor - Vocals
Billy Queen - Drums

References

Jacobs Dream albums
2001 albums